Dabugam is a Vidhan Sabha constituency of Nabarangpur district, Odisha.

This constituency includes Dabugam block, Papadahandi block and 14 Gram panchayats (Atigam, Badagumuda, Balenga, Bankuli, M. Karagam, Butimajhisemla, Ekori, Kodinga, Kosagumuda, Majhidhanua, Motigam, Santoshpur, Taragam and Temara) of Kosagumuda block.

Elected Members

Thirteen elections were held between 1961 and 2014.
Elected members from the Dabugam constituency are:
2019: (76): Monohara Randhari (BJD)
2014: (76): Bhujabal Majhi (Congress)
2009: (76): Bhujabal Majhi (Congress)
2004: (92): Ramesh Chandra Majhi (BJD)
2000: (92): Bhujabal Majhi (Congress)
1995: (92): Jadav Majhi (Janata Dal)
1990: (92): Jadav Majhi (Janata Dal)
1985: (92): Ghasiram Majhi (Congress)
1980: (92): Phulamani Santa (Congress-I)
1977: (92): Shyamaghana Majhi (Janata Party)
1974: (92): Shyamaghana Majhi (Swatantra Party)
1971: (86): Dambaru Majhi (Swatantra Party)
1967: (86): Dambaru Majhi (Swatantra Party)
1961: (2): Jagannath Tripathy (Congress)

2019 Election Result

2014 Election Result
In 2014 election, Indian National Congress candidate Bhujabal Majhi defeated Biju Janata Dal candidate Motiram Nayak by a margin of 6,097 votes.

2009 Election Result
In 2009 election, Indian National Congress candidate Bhujabal Majhi defeated Biju Janata Dal candidate Motiram Nayak by a margin of 7,374 votes.

Notes

References

Assembly constituencies of Odisha
Nabarangpur district